"Should I Come Home (Or Should I Go Crazy)" is a song written by Joe Allen, and recorded by American country music artist Gene Watson.  It was released in September 1979 as the first single from the album Should I Come Home.  The song reached #3 on the Billboard Hot Country Singles & Tracks chart.

Cover versions

 The song was covered by Joe Nichols on his 2005 album III.

Chart performance

References

1979 singles
1979 songs
Gene Watson songs
Joe Nichols songs
Capitol Records singles